Finland–Latvia relations are foreign relations between Finland and Latvia. Finland has an embassy in Riga. Latvia has an embassy in Helsinki. Both countries are full members of the Council of the Baltic Sea States, the European Union and the Eurozone.

In 1999, the President of Latvia visited Finland. Finland pledged its support for Latvia to join the European Union.

In June 1999, Latvian Prime Minister Vilis Kristopans met Finnish Minister for European Affairs and Foreign Trade Kimmo Sasi.

See also
 Foreign relations of Finland
 Foreign relations of Latvia

References

 
Latvia
Bilateral relations of Latvia